Stadion Ludowy (The People's Stadium) is a multi-use stadium in Sosnowiec, Poland.  It is currently used mostly for football matches and serves as the training ground of Zagłębie Sosnowiec.  The stadium has a capacity of 7,500 people.

External links

Stadium images at StadiumDB.com

Ludowy, stadion
Zagłębie Sosnowiec
Buildings and structures in Sosnowiec
Sports venues in Silesian Voivodeship